Coleophora xanthochlora is a moth of the family Coleophoridae. It is found in Tunisia.

References

xanthochlora
Endemic fauna of Tunisia
Moths described in 1956
Moths of Africa